Euskadiko Ezkerra (EE) was a Basque socialist political organisation. It was founded as a coalition of  Euskal Iraultzarako Alderdia (EIA, Basque Party for Revolution or Party for Basque Revolution) and other Basque Marxist forces in 1977 to present lists for the Spanish general elections in the constituencies of Vizcaya, Guipúzcoa and Álava, while Navarrese Left Union (UNAI), an allied coalition, was to present a list in the constituency of Navarre.

History

EE's list in Guipúzcoa won one seat in the Spanish Congress for Francisco Letamendia, one in the Senate for Juan María Bandrés, a lawyer for ETA members, and none in the other constituencies. Many prominent members of EE eventually separated from the coalition and integrated into Herri Batasuna (HB). EE called for "no" in the Referendum for Spanish Constitution in 1978.

Several of the members of ETA (pm) joined peaceful political action in EE after they abandoned violence and negotiated pardons from the Spanish government.

In 1982 it merged with some sectors of PCE-EPK (the Basque branch of PCE) and became a party under the name EE-IPS, Euskadiko Ezkerra-Izquierda para el Socialismo ("Left for Socialism"), while often using the simpler name Euskadiko Ezkerra. Its general secretary in this period was Mario Onaindia, a former ETA member during the Franco era, later replaced by Kepa Aulestia.

EE called for a "no" on the membership of Spain in NATO in the referendum held in 1986. While the "yes" vote won nationally, the "no" campaign triumphed in the Basque Autonomous Community.

After the split of the Basque Nationalist Party (PNV) and the creation of Eusko Alkartasuna (EA) in 1987, EE established several coalitions with the latter. In 1991 EE entered in the government of the Basque Autonomous Community in coalition with both PNV and EA.

Later, in 1991, a majority of party affiliates approved a merger with Socialist Party of the Basque Country (PSE), the branch of the Spanish Socialist Workers' Party (PSOE) for the Basque Autonomous Community. The resulting party is the current PSE-EE.

However a section of Euskadiko Ezkerra disagreed with the PSE merger, and, since the Euskadiko Ezkerra name was retained by the majority of members who approved the merger with the PSE, the remaining faction went on to create a new party, Euskal Ezkerra (EuE, Basque Left) which, in turn, merged soon after with Eusko Alkartasuna.

External links
 Gaizka Fernández Soldevilla, Agur a las armas. EIA, Euskadiko Ezkerra y la disolución de ETA político-militar (1976-1985), en Sancho el sabio. Revista de cultura e investigación vasca, ISSN 1131-5350, Nº 33, 2010, pp. 55–96 

Political parties established in 1977
1977 establishments in Spain
Political parties disestablished in 1991
1991 disestablishments in Spain
Political parties in the Basque Country (autonomous community)
Basque history
Defunct socialist parties in the Basque Country (autonomous community)
Defunct nationalist parties in Spain
Left-wing nationalist parties